There Is Always One More Time is an album by the American musician B.B. King, released in 1991. It is dedicated to Doc Pomus, who cowrote the title song. The first single was "Back in L.A."

King wrote in the liner notes that There Is Always One More Time was his best album.

Production
The album was produced by Stewart Levine. Freddie Washington played bass; Jim Keltner played drums. Joe Sample wrote most of the songs. The title track contains a four-minute guitar solo. King chose to incorporate gospel elements in many of the songs.

Critical reception

The New York Times wrote that "until the gospelly title song, both Mr. King's voice and guitar are obscured by horns, keyboards, backup vocals and booming drums; the album needs a remix to eliminate clutter and sweetening." The Calgary Herald stated that King "comes back with a bluesy sashay that's contemporary and comfortable."

The Toronto Star deemed the album "nice, laid-back blues." Ebony concluded that "the gritty 'Mean and Evil' reflects his Mississippi upbringing, while the moving, melancholy title song is sure to be a blues classic." The Chicago Tribune called "The Lowdown" "a classic after-hours blues, tailor-made for King's impassioned vocals."

Track listing 
All tracks composed by Joe Sample and Will Jennings; except where indicated
 "I'm Moving On" — 4:15
 "Back in L.A." — 5:00
 "The Blues Come over Me" — 5:13
 "Fool Me Once" — 4:18
 "The Lowdown" — 4:11
 "Mean and Evil" (Arthur Adams) — 4:20
 "Something up My Sleeve" (Arthur Adams) — 4:27
 "Roll, Roll, Roll" — 5:57
 "There Is Always One More Time" (Doc Pomus, Ken Hirsch) — 8:26

Personnel
B.B. King – vocals, lead guitar
Arthur Adams, Michael Landau – guitar
Freddie Washington – bass guitar
Joe Sample – piano
Neil Larsen – keyboards, Hammond organ
Jim Keltner – drums
Lenny Castro – percussion
Bunny Hull, Paulette Brown, Valerie Pinkston-Mayo – background vocals

References

B.B. King albums
1991 albums
MCA Records albums
Albums produced by Stewart Levine